Old Mokotow is the oldest neighborhood of the Mokotów district in Warsaw, Poland. It is located in the north-western part of the Mokotów district on the characteristic Vistula embankment. Largely a residential neighborhood, Stary Mokotów is home to several embassies and historic parks.

The original name "Mokotowo" most likely comes from the name of the Prussian owner of the village and appears for the first time in documents in 1367. Although the area has been populated at least since the early Middle Ages, it was not until early 1916 when Old Mokotow, with many other Warsaw suburbs, was incorporated into the city area.

Old Mokotow incorporates two metro stations - Racławicka and Pole Mokotowskie.

Notable places 

 Mokotów Field
 SGH Warsaw School of Economics Campus
 New Theatre (Nowy Teatr)
 Iluzjon Cinema
 Mokotów Prison
 KS Warszawianka
 Morskie Oko Park
 Szuster Palace

References

External links
 

Neighbourhoods of Mokotów